Eddie Blacker (born 15 December 1999) is a professional rugby league footballer who plays as a  for the Penrith Panthers in the NRL.

Blacker previously played for the St George Illawarra Dragons in the National Rugby League.

Career

Early career 
Blacker played his junior rugby league at the Pine Rivers Bears in Brisbane Rugby League.

Blacker joined St. George Illawarra Dragons from the Brisbane Broncos Under-20s in 2019.

2020 
Blacker made his debut for St. George Illawarra against the Melbourne Storm in round 20 of the 2020 NRL season.

2021 
On 7 April it was announced that Blacker had signed with Penrith in a player swap with Billy Burns who had signed with St. George.

2022
On 24 June, Penrith announced the re-signing of Blacker for the 2023 NRL season.

References

External links 
 Panthers Profile

1999 births
Living people
Rugby league props
Australian rugby league players
Rugby league players from Brisbane
St. George Illawarra Dragons players
Penrith Panthers players